Varaždinske Toplice (or ;) is a small town in northern part of Croatia in Varaždin County. The town has been well known throughout the centuries for its hot springs as well as a medical center. In Ancient Rome it was known as Aquae Iasae.

Thermal Spa

Today, the town's biggest employers are "Hotel Minerva", built in 1981 with approx. 440 beds, and Hospital for Medicinal Rehabilitation "Terme" which is one of the leading rehabilitation centers for spinal cord and neurological injuries and disorders in Croatia. In 2013 Varaždin County, the formal owner of the hotel and the hospital, outlined a plan of building a new hospital which would continue on the expertise in spinal cord treatment. The plan also includes the construction of a completely new hotel, as well as an adaptation of the existing hotel Minerva. The value of proposed investments revolves around €80 million.

Varaždinske Toplice has two churches, the smaller one having been built in 13th century with the resting place of Antun Kukuljević, a supreme principal of all the schools in Croatia between 1836 and 1847, and father of Ivan Kukuljević Sakcinski, next to the church.

The town is also famous for being a site of a school in 1480 which is considered to be the oldest known school in the Balkan peninsula. The most recent school building for town's elementary school was opened in 1980 thus commemorating 500 years of education.

Settlements
Nowadays, the town is also the center of a municipality which consists of the town itself and surrounding villages. In the 2011 census, the population of the municipality was 6,364, composed of the following settlements:

 Boričevec Toplički, population 40
 Črnile, population 162
 Čurilovec, population 131
 Donja Poljana, population 426
 Drenovec, population 361
 Gornja Poljana, population 269
 Grešćevina, population 140
 Hrastovec Toplički, population 176
 Jalševec Svibovečki, population 302
 Jarki Horvatićevi, population 47
 Leskovec Toplički, population 487
 Lovrentovec, population 118
 Lukačevec Toplički, population 55
 Martinkovec, population 66
 Petkovec Toplički, population 265
 Pišćanovec, population 73
 Retkovec Svibovečki, population 23
 Rukljevina, population 17
 Svibovec, population 302
 Škarnik, population 84
 Tuhovec, population 706
 Varaždinske Toplice, population 1,765
 Vrtlinovec, population 349

Notable people
 Ana Bešenić, writer
 , journalist and writer
 Lavoslav Horvat, architect
 Ruža Pospiš-Baldani, opera singer

References

External links

 Official website for Varaždinske Toplice 
 Varaždinske Toplice Tourist Board 
 Varaždinske Toplice Municipal Museum 

Cities and towns in Croatia
Spa towns in Croatia
Populated places in Varaždin County